The Great Indian Kitchen is a 2021 Indian Malayalam-language drama film written and directed by Jeo Baby. The film tells the story of a newly-wed woman (Nimisha Sajayan) who struggles to be the submissive wife that her husband (Suraj Venjaramood) and his family expect her to be. The music was composed by Sooraj S. Kurup and Mathews Pulickan.

The film was released on Neestream on 15 January 2021. The film received universal critical acclaim and won Kerala State Film Award for Best Film, Best Screenplay award for Baby and Best Sound Designer award for Tony Babu.

The film was remade in Tamil under the same title with Aishwarya Rajesh and Rahul Ravindran in the lead roles. A Hindi remake is in pre-production with Sanya Malhotra and Angad Bedi in lead roles.

Plot 
An educated dancer, raised in Manama, Bahrain finds herself in an arranged marriage to a teacher in a very traditional and patriarchal family. While the domestic routine of the Wife begins in the sweet bliss of a new marriage, things begin to go down south. The drudgery of the kitchen and its many unpleasantries - cleaning, filthy utensils and leaking taps - are left to the women while the men mostly indulge themselves with their phone or yoga. The family is so patriarchal that her mother-in-law hands his toothbrush to the father-in-law, who is lounging by the verandah. The men eat their meals first and leave the place a mess without concern for how the women can eat food after them. Their convenience and comfort always come before consideration for their wives. While the new bride takes a while to adjust to these new surroundings and eventually somewhat makes peace with them, her mother-in-law goes to take care of her daughter who is seven months pregnant.

The whole responsibility of cooking, cleaning and other household chores falls on her. Her egotistical husband is inconsiderate of her needs and feelings. When she tells him that it hurts when having sex and asks for some foreplay, he remarks she seems to know everything on the topic and condescendingly tells her he should attracted to her for foreplay, making her cry to sleep.

Her father-in-law forbids her from finding employment, citing that a woman in the house brings prosperity to the family. When she gets her period, she is appalled to discover that the family's beliefs regarding menstruation are extremely regressive. She is asked to hole herself up all alone on the floor in a room, bathe in the river, eat separately and wash all the things she touches. She is even asked to go stay with a relative or to sleep outside during those days.

While these events transpire, Kerala is grappling with the Sabarimala temple verdict where the courts decided that menstruation is not an impurity and so women should be allowed to visit the temple. Many people, including the groom's family, do not approve of the verdict.

All these injustices boil over one day and end up with the wife throwing murky kitchen sink water on her husband and father-in-law and leaving the family for her freedom and dignity. The film ends with a scene showing her as an independent dance teacher arriving in her own car while her ex-husband is married again and the second wife seems to meet the first one's fate.

Cast

Production
The shooting of the film started on July 11, 2020, in Calicut. The entire movie was shot within a house except for some outdoor scenes. The film's principal cast includes several theatre artistes from Calicut.

Music 
Sooraj S. Kurup composed the film's soundtracks, which consisted of two songs. The lyrics were written by Mrudula Devi S and Dhanya Suresh. 
Two songs from this movie are in paluva language which is a mysterious language in paraya community

Release
The film was directly released on Neestream, a Malayalam streaming platform on 15 January 2021. Several mainstream OTT platforms including Amazon Prime Video and Netflix as well as major television channels rejected the film due to some scenes related to the Sabarimala woman entry issue. Although, Amazon Prime Video got the rights of the film after three months of its release on Neestream. The satellite rights were later purchased by Asianet due to the film's positive response.

Reception

Critical response 
Upon release, it received positive reactions from various film critics and was well received by the audience.

Litty Simon of Malayala Manorama has written that, "The excellent direction, well-written characters and seasoned performances with insightful message makes The Great Indian Kitchen a fulfilling experience." Anjana George of The Times of India praised, "The Great Indian Kitchen comes as an eye-opener, at a time many women are still judged for their cooking skills than any other capabilities. It not only talks about the new-gen women who question such unsung slavery but is also a tribute to the women who have been silently managing it inside every home for centuries." Soumya Rajendran of The News Minute has effused, "The Great Indian Kitchen rips through patriarchy, the bedrock of the institutions of family and religion."

S. R. Praveen of The Hindu said that 'Actors Nimisha Sajayan and Suraj Venjaramoodu are excellent in this hard-hitting take on the sheer drudgery of everyday life, that many women go through. Sajin Shrijith of The New Indian Express wrote: "This film made me want to talk to every woman in my family and ask them how they handled their frustrations and why some of them never dared to question their men?." Haricharan Pudipeddi of Hindustan Times wrote: The Great Indian Kitchen has to be the most powerful film on patriarchy in recent years and it makes for a very important watch. Its lead actor Nimisha Sajayan is unbelievably convincing. Sify has rated The Great Indian Kitchen as 4 stars out of 5 and has written the film as an excellent family drama. Bobby Sing from The Free Press Journal rated the film four in a scale of five and described it as an "unusually exceptional film that makes you feel the guilt." Baradwaj Rangan of Film Companion South wrote "The Great Indian Kitchen is a powerful tale Of emancipation".

Accolades 
 51st Kerala State Film Awards
 Kerala State Film Award for Best Film
 Kerala State Film Award for Best Screenplay - Jeo Baby
 Best Sound Designer - Tony Babu

 44th Kerala Film Critics Association Awards
 Kerala Film Critics Association Award for Best Film

 67th Filmfare Awards South
 Filmfare Award for Best Actress - Malayalam - Nimisha Sajayan

 10th South Indian International Movie Awards
 Critics Choice Award for Best Actor (Malayalam) - Nimisha Sajayan

References

External links
 

Films not released in theaters due to the COVID-19 pandemic
2021 films
2020s Malayalam-language films
2021 drama films
Films scored by Sooraj S. Kurup
Films directed by Jeo Baby
Films shot in Kozhikode
Indian family films
Indian drama films